Alexander Norman Remneas  (February 21, 1886 – August 27, 1975) was an American baseball player. He appeared in three games in Major League Baseball as a pitcher for the Detroit Tigers in 1912 and for the St. Louis Browns in 1915.

Early years
Remneas was born in Minneapolis in 1886.

Professional baseball
Remneas began his professional baseball career with the Butte Miners of the Union Association. He compiled a 22–18 record for Butte in 1911.  He continued to play professional baseball from 1911 to 1915, including three games in Major League Baseball as a pitcher for the Detroit Tigers in 1912 and for the St. Louis Browns in 1915.  In his three major league games, Remneas had no decisions in 7⅔ innings pitched with a 7.04 earned run average (ERA).  He played in the Pacific Coast League during the 1915 season.

Later years
After retiring from baseball, Remneas worked for many years with the Mountain States Telephone & Telegraph Company and moved to Phoenix, Arizona, in 1939 as an assistant state manager for Arizona. He became the state manager for Arizona and was then transferred in 1946 to Colorado.  His wife Bess died in 1964.  He died in Phoenix in 1975 at age 89.

References

Detroit Tigers players
Major League Baseball pitchers
Baseball players from Minnesota
St. Louis Browns players
1886 births
1975 deaths
Butte Miners players
Great Falls Electrics players
Providence Grays (minor league) players
Salt Lake City Bees players
Oakland Oaks (baseball) players